Karode  is a village in Thiruvananthapuram district in the state of Kerala, India.

Demographics
 India census, Karode had a population of 31506 with 15634 males and 15872 females.

References

Villages in Thiruvananthapuram district